Robert James Huber (August 29, 1922 - April 23, 2001) was a politician from the U.S. state of Michigan.

Huber was born in Detroit, Michigan, where he attended the public schools. He attended the University of Detroit 1935–1937, and graduated from Culver Military Academy, 1939. He received a B.S. from the Sheffield Scientific School of Yale University in New Haven, Connecticut in 1943. He served in the United States Army, 1943–1946. Huber worked as a banker and businessman, and was mayor of Troy, Michigan, 1959–1964. He served on the board of supervisors of Oakland County, Michigan. 1959–1963. He was a member of the Michigan Senate from the 16th district from 1965 to 1970.

Huber was elected as a Republican from Michigan's 18th congressional district to the 93rd United States Congress, serving from January 3, 1973, to January 3, 1975. He was an unsuccessful candidate for reelection in 1974, losing to future Democratic Governor of Michigan, James Blanchard. He ran unsuccessfully for nomination to the United States Senate from Michigan in 1970, 1976, 1982, and 1988. He was chairman of the board, Michigan Chrome and Chemical Co.

Huber died in Troy, Michigan, and was interred in Memory Gardens Cemetery, in Hope, Arkansas.

References

The Political Graveyard

1922 births
2001 deaths
Republican Party Michigan state senators
Yale School of Engineering & Applied Science alumni
Mayors of places in Michigan
Culver Academies alumni
United States Army soldiers
United States Army personnel of World War II
University of Detroit Mercy alumni
People from Troy, Michigan
Politicians from Detroit
Businesspeople from Michigan
Republican Party members of the United States House of Representatives from Michigan
20th-century American politicians
20th-century American businesspeople